County-level divisions are the third level of administration of the People's Republic of China and include counties, autonomous counties, banners, autonomous banners, county-level cities and districts. Most county-level divisions are administered as part of prefecture-level divisions, but some are administered directly by province-level divisions. Among the county-level divisions, this list also includes the Republic of China-controlled Taiwan Province and fractured Fujian Province.

The following lists show all county-level divisions in each province-level division.

Provinces

East
Anhui
Fujian
Jiangsu
Jiangxi
Shandong
Zhejiang

Northwest
Gansu
Qinghai
Shaanxi

Southwest
Guizhou
Sichuan
Yunnan

Central
Hubei
Hunan
Henan

South
Guangdong
Hainan

North
Hebei
Shanxi

Northeast
Heilongjiang
Jilin
Liaoning

Autonomous regions
Guangxi
Inner Mongolia
Ningxia
Tibet
Xinjiang

Municipalities
Beijing
Chongqing
Shanghai
Tianjin

Special administrative regions 
 Hong Kong
 Macau

.01
County-level divisions
Counties of China
China 3